Hole formalism in quantum chemistry states that for many electronic properties, one may consider systems with e or (n-e), the number of unoccupied sites or "holes", to be equivalent.
The number of microstates (N) of a system corresponds to the total number of distinct arrangements for a number e of electrons to be placed in a number n of possible orbital positions:

In hole formalism, the commutative property of multiplication applies, meaning that in the above equation,

Example 
For a set of p orbitals, n = 6 since there are two vacant positions in each of the three orbitals (px, py, pz). Therefore, for P2 (e = 2 and n = 6):

Based on the hole formalism, microstates of P4 (e = 4 and n = 6) are:

Here it is seen that P4 (2 holes) and P2 (4 holes) give equivalent values of N. The same is true for all p, d, f, ... systems such as d1/d9 or f2/f12.

This is characterised by the symmetry of k-combinations in general, that is: 
For all positive integers n, e where n ≥ e.

See also 
Term symbol
Electron hole

References 

Electron
Electron states
Quantum chemistry